The 1975 Cornell Big Red football team was an American football team that represented Cornell University during the 1975 NCAA Division I football season. Cornell finished last in the Ivy League. 

In its first season under head coach George Seifert, the team compiled a 1–8 record and was outscored 247 to 151. Don Fanelli and Steve Horrigan were the team captains. 

Cornell's winless (0–7) conference record placed last in the Ivy League standings. The Big Red were outscored 217 to 108 by Ivy opponents. 

Cornell played its home games at Schoellkopf Field in Ithaca, New York.

Schedule

References

Cornell
Cornell Big Red football seasons
Cornell Big Red football